Gustav Rasmussen (August 10, 1895 – September 13, 1953) was a Danish statesman and diplomat who served as foreign minister of Denmark from 1945 to 1950. He later served as Danish ambassador to Italy.

References

External links
 Image of Gustav Rasmussen

1895 births
1953 deaths
Danish diplomats